Siamogale is an extinct genus of giant otter from the late Miocene-early Pliocene of eastern Asia. Three species are currently known, S. thailandica and S. bounosa from Thailand and S. melilutra from China.

References

Prehistoric mustelids
Miocene carnivorans
Otters
Neogene mammals of Asia
Pliocene genus extinctions
Fossil taxa described in 1983
Prehistoric carnivoran genera